Mark Hodge Murphy (born July 13, 1955) is an American football executive and former American football player who is the president and chief executive officer for the Green Bay Packers of the National Football League (NFL). Prior to that, he was the athletic director at Northwestern University and Colgate University. He also played in the NFL as a safety for the NFL's Washington Redskins for eight seasons from 1977 to 1984.

Early years and education
Murphy was born in Fulton, New York. He attended Colgate University, where he was also a member of the Theta Chi fraternity and played college football. Before his NFL career ended and while playing for the Redskins he obtained an MBA from American University's Kogod School of Business in 1983. Murphy graduated with a J.D. degree from the Georgetown University Law Center in 1988.

Professional career

Murphy played in Super Bowl XVII and Super Bowl XVIII with the Washington Redskins.  He played a key role in the Redskins 27–17 Super Bowl XVII win over the Miami Dolphins, recording a second half interception of Miami quarterback David Woodley's pass with the Dolphins on Washington's 37-yard line.

Murphy's best season was in 1983, when he led the NFL with nine interceptions and returned them for 127 yards.  He finished his eight-season career with 27 interceptions and 282 return yards, along with six fumble recoveries for 22 returns yards, in 109 games.  He also made the Pro Bowl after the 1983 season.

Murphy was the Redskins representative to the NFL Players Association.  He served on the bargaining committee in the players' strike that caused the cancellation of seven games during the 1982 season. Many suspect that the Redskins' decision to release him after the 1983 season and the reluctance of any other team to sign him was retribution for his union activity.

Sports executive
Murphy moved back to Hamilton, New York, to become the athletic director at Colgate University in the early 1990s until 2003. Later, Murphy moved to Evanston, Illinois to serve as the athletic director at Northwestern University. On December 3, 2007, he was announced as the new Green Bay Packers President and CEO. On February 6, 2011, Green Bay won Super Bowl XLV, giving Murphy his second Super Bowl victory, thanks in part to the performance of Super Bowl MVP Aaron Rodgers. On July 2, 2022, Murphy announced that he will retire on July 13, 2025, as that would be the day he turns 70.

References

External links

Green Bay Packers bio

1955 births
American football safeties
Colgate Raiders athletic directors
Colgate Raiders baseball players
Colgate Raiders football players
Georgetown University Law Center alumni
Green Bay Packers presidents
Kogod School of Business alumni
Living people
National Conference Pro Bowl players
National Football League team presidents
Northwestern Wildcats athletic directors
People from Erie County, New York
People from Fulton, Oswego County, New York
Players of American football from New York (state)
Washington Redskins players